Mark Ellingson (1905 – 1993) was the 5th president of the Rochester Institute of Technology, succeeding John A. Randall, from 1936 – 1969. He rose from a teacher at the institute to the presidency, which he held for longer than anyone before or since, and in many ways he brought the institute into its modern form. During Ellingson's tenure in office from 1936 to 1969, enrollment in day and evening classes rose from 2,250 to 16,000. He also oversaw a major expansion of the RIT endowment; a 1937 merger with the Empire School of Printing; the 1944 renaming to "Rochester Institute of Technology" (formerly, Rochester Athenaeum and Mechanics Institute); the planning, construction, and 1968 transfer to the current campus in Henrietta.  He also spearheaded the drive to have RIT selected as the location for the National Technical Institute for the Deaf, which admitted its first students in 1968.

The tallest building on the Henrietta campus, a residence hall nicknamed "Tower A", is named for Ellingson.

References

Presidents of Rochester Institute of Technology
1905 births
1993 deaths
People from Magrath
Canadian emigrants to the United States
20th-century American academics